Charles Waterton (3 June 1782 – 27 May 1865) was an English naturalist, plantation overseer and explorer best known for his pioneering work regarding  conservation.

Family and religion
Waterton was of a Roman Catholic landed gentry family descended from Reiner de Waterton. The Watertons had remained Catholic after the English Reformation and consequently the vast majority of their estates were confiscated. Charles Waterton himself was a devout and ascetic Catholic, and maintained strong links with the Vatican.

Early life
"Squire" Waterton was born at Walton Hall, Wakefield, Yorkshire to Thomas Waterton and Anne Bedingfield.

He was educated at Stonyhurst College in Lancashire where his interest in exploration and wildlife were already evident. On one occasion Waterton was caught by the school's Jesuit Superior scaling the towers at the front of the building; almost at the top, the Superior ordered him to come down the way he had gone up. Waterton records in his autobiography that while he was at the school, "by a mutual understanding, I was considered rat-catcher to the establishment, and also fox-taker, foumart-killer, and cross-bow charger at the time when the young rooks were fledged. ... I followed up my calling with great success. The vermin disappeared by the dozen; the books were moderately well-thumbed; and according to my notion of things, all went on perfectly right."

South America
In 1804 he travelled to British Guiana to take charge of his uncle's slave plantations near Georgetown. In 1812 he started to explore the hinterland of the colony, making four journeys between then and 1824, and reaching Brazil walking barefoot in the rainy season. He described his discoveries in his book Waterton's Wanderings in South America, which inspired British schoolboys such as Charles Darwin and Alfred Russel Wallace. His explorations laid to rest the persistent myth of Raleigh's Lake Parime by suggesting that the seasonal flooding of the Rupununi savannah had been misidentified as a lake.

Waterton was a skilled taxidermist and preserved many of the animals he encountered on his expeditions.  He employed a unique method of taxidermy, soaking the specimens in what he called "sublimate of mercury". Unlike many preserved ("stuffed") animals, his specimens are hollow and lifelike. He also displayed his anarchic sense of humour in some of his taxidermy: one tableau he created (now lost) consisted of reptiles dressed as famous English Protestants and entitled "The English Reformation Zoologically Demonstrated". Another specimen was the bottom of a howler monkey which he turned into an almost human face and simply labelled "The Nondescript". This specimen is still on display at the Wakefield Museum, along with other items from Waterton's collection.

While he was in British Guiana Waterton taught his skills to one of his uncle's slaves, John Edmonstone. Edmonstone, by then freed and practising taxidermy in Edinburgh, in turn taught the teenage Darwin.

Waterton is credited with bringing the anaesthetic agent curare wourali to Europe. In London, with Fellows of the Royal Society, he immobilised several animals, including a cat and a she-ass, with his wourali [curare], and then revived the she-ass with a bellows. (Hence) the ass was named Wouralia and lived for years at Walton Hall.

Walton Hall
In the 1820s Waterton returned to Walton Hall and built a nine-foot-high wall around three miles (5 km) of the estate, turning it into the world's first wildfowl and nature reserve, making him one of the world's first environmentalists. He also invented the bird nesting box. The Waterton Collection, on display at Stonyhurst College until 1966, is now in the Wakefield Museum. Waterton owned a dog who was prominent in the foundation of the modern English Mastiff and may be traced back to in the pedigrees of all living dogs of this breed.

On 11 May 1829, at the age of 47, Waterton married 17-year-old Anne Edmonstone, the granddaughter of an Arawak Indian. His wife died shortly after giving birth to their son, Edmund, when she was only 18. After her death he slept on the floor with a block of wood for a pillow, "as self-inflicted penance for her soul!"

Waterton was an early opponent of pollution. He fought a long-running court case against the owners of a soap works that had been set up near his estate in 1839, and sent out poisonous chemicals that severely damaged the trees in the park and polluted the lake. He was eventually successful in having the soap works moved.

Waterton died after fracturing his ribs and injuring his liver in a fall on his estate. His coffin was taken from the hall by barge to his chosen resting place, near the spot where the accident happened, in a funeral cortege led by the Bishop of Beverley, and followed at the lakeside by many local people. The grave was between two oak trees, which are no longer there.

Alleged eccentricities
A range of stories have been handed down about Charles Waterton, few of which are verifiable. The following are at least documented:

 He "liked to dress as a scarecrow and sit in trees."
 He pretended to be his own butler and then tickled his guests with a coal brush.
 He climbed tall trees to replace nestling heron chicks which had fallen from their nests in a storm.
 He pretended to be a dog and would then bite the legs of his guests as they came into his house.
 Whenever he was ill he cupped himself heavily "to cure anything and everything, from backache to malaria". In the chapter titled, "Squire Waterton," Harley relates his conversation with Waterton that describes Waterton's philosophy and practice of bleeding himself.

Legacy
Waterton is chiefly remembered for his association with curare, and for his writings on natural history and conservation. David Attenborough has described him  as “one of the first people anywhere to recognise, not only that the natural world was of great importance, but that it needed protection as humanity made more and more demands on it”.

Waterton's house, Walton Hall, which may be approached only by a pedestrian bridge to its own island, is now the main building of a hotel. There is a golf course in the vicinity and various public footpaths, some leading to a nature reserve- Anglers Country Park.

Waterton Lakes in Alberta, Canada, now a national park, was named after him by Thomas Blakiston in 1858. A Wakefield road and school in Wakefield, Yorkshire, are also named after him.

Bibliography 
 
 2nd edition 1828. London : Printed for B. Fellowes
 5th edition 1852. London : B. Fellowes
 edition 1882,  ed. Rev. J.G. Wood. London : MacMillan and Co. With a biographical introduction by J.G. Wood
 edition 1887. New York : Cassell & Co. Ltd. With an introduction by Norman Moore, M.D. (pp. 5-34)
 edition 1925. London / New York : J.M. Dent & Sons, Ltd. / E.P. Dutton & Co. Inc. (Everyman Library edition). With an introduction by Edmund Selous
 
 3rd edition 1839. London : Longman, Orme, Brown, Green & Longmans
 5th edition 1844. London : Longman,  Brown, Green & Longmans

Footnotes

References 
Charles Waterton at Our Heritage Accessed 24 November 2008.

Further reading

External links
 
 
 
Waterton and Wouralia
Waterton at Wakefield Museum
 Charles Waterton, Squire of Walton Hall
 Archival Material at 

1782 births
1865 deaths
People educated at Stonyhurst College
English explorers
English naturalists
History of Guyana
People from Walton, Wakefield
English Roman Catholics
Stonyhurst College
English conservationists
Taxidermists